The 1929 Loyola Ramblers football team was an American football team that represented Loyola University Chicago as an independent during the 1929 college football season.  The team compiled a 5–2–1 record.

The team played its home games at the newly-constructed Loyola Stadium, located on the school's campus in Rogers Park. The stadium was dedicated on October 12, 1939, prior to a game against Coe College. The field was built at a cost of $25,000, and the stands on the west side of the field cost $60,000. The seating capacity was 10,000.

Daniel J. Lamont was the team's head coach and the school's athletic director. Key players included halfbacks Marty Griffen and Les Malloy (sometimes spelled Molloy) and fullback Tommy Flynn. Quarterback Corny Collins was the captain.

Schedule

References

Loyola
Loyola Ramblers football seasons
Loyola Ramblers football